Doug Jones (February 27, 1937 – November 14, 2017) was an American heavyweight boxer. He was best known for his 1963 fight with Cassius Clay that resulted in a challenged loss.

Early life
Jones was raised in New York City. He was a childhood friend of writer Claude Brown and appears in Brown's autobiographical novel Manchild in the Promised Land (1965) with the alias Turk.

Boxing career
Doug "Pugilism" Jones started off his career successfully with 19 consecutive wins against mostly lightly regarded opponents but did defeat ex-Middleweight champion Bobo Olson, until his first loss occurred at the hands of Eddie Machen. He lost his next two fights, and the third a draw. Jones fought for the world light-heavyweight championship against Harold Johnson but lost a 15-round decision.

He then moved up to the heavyweight division. Jones won his next two fights against Bob Foster (who was in his ninth professional fight) and Zora Folley. Jones also split two fights with Billy Daniels. His best known fight was against a young Cassius Clay in March 1963, when he lost a ten-round decision in front of a sold-out crowd in Madison Square Garden. Many thought Jones deserved the decision, which was loudly booed by the Garden Crowd. Of 25 boxing writers at the Garden that night, 13 scored it for Jones, 10 favored Clay, and two called it even. The Ring selected this as its Fight of the Year in 1963.

He continued boxing with limited success, losing to distinguished boxers George Chuvalo, Joe Frazier and Ernie Terrell, with the Terrell fight for the WBA title. Overall, he compiled a record of 30 wins (20 by knockout), 10 losses, and 1 draw.

Professional boxing record

|-
|align="center" colspan=8|30 Wins (20 knockouts, 10 decisions), 10 Losses (3 knockouts, 7 decisions), 1 Draw 
|-
| align="center" style="border-style: none none solid solid; background: #e3e3e3"|Result
| align="center" style="border-style: none none solid solid; background: #e3e3e3"|Record
| align="center" style="border-style: none none solid solid; background: #e3e3e3"|Opponent
| align="center" style="border-style: none none solid solid; background: #e3e3e3"|Type
| align="center" style="border-style: none none solid solid; background: #e3e3e3"|Round
| align="center" style="border-style: none none solid solid; background: #e3e3e3"|Date
| align="center" style="border-style: none none solid solid; background: #e3e3e3"|Location
| align="center" style="border-style: none none solid solid; background: #e3e3e3"|Notes
|-
|Loss
|30–10–1
|align=left| Boone Kirkman
|TKO
|6
|10/08/1967
|align=left| Seattle Center Coliseum, Seattle, Washington
|
|-
|Win
|30–9–1
|align=left| Boone Kirkman
|TKO
|7
|29/06/1967
|align=left| Seattle Center Coliseum, Seattle, Washington
|align=left|
|-
|Loss
|29–9–1
|align=left| Joe Frazier
|KO
|6
|21/02/1967
|align=left| Philadelphia Arena, Philadelphia, Pennsylvania
|
|-
|Loss
|29–8–1
|align=left| Thad Spencer
|UD
|10
|14/10/1966
|align=left| Cow Palace, Daly City, California
|
|-
|Loss
|29–7–1
|align=left| Ernie Terrell
|UD
|15
|28/06/1966
|align=left| Sam Houston Coliseum, Houston, Texas
|style="text-align:left;"|
|-
|Win
|29–6–1
|align=left| Lou Bailey
|TKO
|6
|08/03/1966
|align=left| Miami Beach Auditorium, Miami Beach, Florida
|align=left|
|-
|Win
|28–6–1
|align=left| Archie McBride
|KO
|5
|28/12/1965
|align=left| Miami Beach Auditorium, Miami Beach, Florida
|align=left|
|-
|Win
|27–6–1
|align=left| Chip Johnson
|KO
|3
|30/11/1965
|align=left| Miami Beach Auditorium, Miami Beach, Florida
|
|-
|Win
|26–6–1
|align=left| Harvey C. Jones
|TKO
|4
|21/09/1965
|align=left| Miami Beach Auditorium, Miami Beach, Florida
|align=left|
|-
|Win
|25–6–1
|align=left| Prentice Snipes
|KO
|2
|14/09/1965
|align=left| Miami Beach Auditorium, Miami Beach, Florida
|align=left|
|-
|Loss
|24–6–1
|align=left| George Chuvalo
|TKO
|11
|02/10/1964
|align=left| Madison Square Garden, New York City
|
|-
|Loss
|24–5–1
|align=left| Billy Daniels
|SD
|10
|14/08/1964
|align=left| Madison Square Garden, New York City
|
|-
|Win
|24–4–1
|align=left| LeRoy Green
|UD
|10
|16/05/1964
|align=left| National Stadium, Kingston, Jamaica
|
|-
|Win
|23–4–1
|align=left| Tom McNeeley
|TKO
|5
|03/02/1964
|align=left| New York Coliseum, Bronx, New York
|align=left|
|-
|Win
|22–4–1
|align=left| Billy Daniels
|PTS
|10
|14/06/1963
|align=left| Teaneck Armory, Teaneck, New Jersey
|
|-
|Loss
|21–4–1
|align=left| Cassius Clay
|UD
|10
|13/03/1963
|align=left| Madison Square Garden, New York City
|
|-
|Win
|21–3–1
|align=left| Zora Folley
|KO
|7
|15/12/1962
|align=left| Madison Square Garden, New York City
|
|-
|Win
|20–3–1
|align=left| Bob Foster
|TKO
|8
|20/10/1962
|align=left| Madison Square Garden, New York City
|
|-
|Draw
|19–3–1
|align=left| Erich Schoppner
|PTS
|10
|29/09/1962
|align=left| Westfalenhallen, Dortmund, North Rhine-Westphalia
|align=left|
|-
|Loss
|19–3
|align=left| Zora Folley
|UD
|10
|01/08/1962
|align=left| Denver Auditorium Arena, Denver, Colorado
|
|-
|Loss
|19–2
|align=left| Harold Johnson
|UD
|15
|12/05/1962
|align=left| Philadelphia Arena, Philadelphia, Pennsylvania
|align=left|
|-
|Loss
|19–1
|align=left| Eddie Machen
|UD
|10
|02/12/1961
|align=left| Miami Beach Convention Hall, Miami Beach, Florida
|
|-
|Win
|19–0
|align=left| Von Clay
|TKO
|10
|26/08/1961
|align=left| Madison Square Garden, New York City
|
|-
|Win
|18–0
|align=left| Pete Rademacher
|KO
|5
|29/04/1961
|align=left| St. Nicholas Arena, New York City
|align=left|
|-
|Win
|17–0
|align=left| Floyd McCoy
|KO
|3
|13/03/1961
|align=left| Maple Leaf Gardens, Toronto, Ontario
|align=left|
|-
|Win
|16–0
|align=left| Carl Bobo Olson
|KO
|6
|31/08/1960
|align=left| Chicago Stadium, Chicago, Illinois
|
|-
|Win
|15–0
|align=left| Von Clay
|SD
|10
|24/06/1960
|align=left| St. Nicholas Arena, New York City
|
|-
|Win
|14–0
|align=left| Von Clay
|UD
|10
|28/03/1960
|align=left| St. Nicholas Arena, New York City
|
|-
|Win
|13–0
|align=left| LeRoy Green
|UD
|10
|15/02/1960
|align=left| Academy of Music, New York City
|
|-
|Win
|12–0
|align=left| Clarence Floyd
|UD
|10
|08/01/1960
|align=left| Madison Square Garden, New York City
|align=left|
|-
|Win
|11–0
|align=left| Juan Pomare
|SD
|10
|09/11/1959
|align=left| Academy of Music, New York City
|
|-
|Win
|10–0
|align=left| Chuck Whittley
|TKO
|4
|23/10/1959
|align=left| Madison Square Garden, New York City
|align=left|
|-
|Win
|9–0
|align=left| Richard Hill
|TKO
|4
|14/08/1959
|align=left| Madison Square Garden, New York City
|align=left|
|-
|Win
|8–0
|align=left| Sonny Boykins
|TKO
|2
|15/06/1959
|align=left| St. Nicholas Arena, New York City
|align=left|
|-
|Win
|7–0
|align=left| Rudy Corney
|PTS
|4
|22/05/1959
|align=left| Madison Square Garden, New York City
|align=left|
|-
|Win
|6–0
|align=left| Gunnar Doerner
|TKO
|2
|08/05/1959
|align=left| Syracuse War Memorial Arena, Syracuse, New York
|
|-
|Win
|5–0
|align=left| Frank LaPola
|PTS
|6
|06/03/1959
|align=left| Madison Square Garden, New York City
|align=left|
|-
|Win
|4–0
|align=left| Edmund George
|TKO
|4
|30/01/1959
|align=left| Madison Square Garden, New York City
|align=left|
|-
|Win
|3–0
|align=left| Andre Tessier
|TKO
|3
|19/12/1958
|align=left| Madison Square Garden, New York City
|align=left|
|-
|Win
|2–0
|align=left| Vince Ferguson
|TKO
|2
|19/09/1958
|align=left| Madison Square Garden, New York City
|
|-
|Win
|1–0
|align=left| Jimmy McNair
|PTS
|4
|22/08/1958
|align=left| Madison Square Garden, New York City
|align=left|

Exhibition boxing record

References

External links

1937 births
2017 deaths
Boxers from New York City
American male boxers
Heavyweight boxers